Move Over! is an album by Janis Joplin released for Record Store Day 2011. The album contains unreleased, rare and alternate songs from all three of Joplin's backing bands, Big Brother and the Holding Company, Kozmic Blues Band and Full Tilt Boogie Band.

Track listing

"Magic of Love"
"Call On Me"
"Piece of My Heart"
"Summertime"
"Raise Your Hand"
"Bo Diddley"
"Move Over"
"My Baby"

Janis Joplin compilation albums
Compilation albums published posthumously
2011 compilation albums
Record Store Day releases